Chara virgata is slender, branched freshwater green alga.

Description
Chara virgata grows to 30 cm in length. Its structure is unlike any other alga. It has a main axis of elongated nodes with whorled laterals. In colour it is dark green.

References

Charophyta
Taxa named by Friedrich Traugott Kützing